Absolute Championship Akhmat (ACA), formerly known as Absolute Championship Berkut (ACB), is a Russian mixed martial arts, kickboxing and Brazilian jiu-jitsu organization and one of the leading promotions in Europe. To date, most events have been hosted in Grozny, Russia. ACA has also held events in other Russian cities, as well as in Australia, Austria, Azerbaijan, Belarus, Belgium, Brazil, Canada, China, England, France, Georgia, Germany, Italy, Kazakhstan, the Netherlands, Poland, Romania, Scotland, Slovakia, Tajikistan, Turkey, the United Arab Emirates and the United States.

History

Absolute Championship Berkut 
ACB was founded by Mairbek Khasiev, a citizen of Chechnya.  In 2009, he founded the Berkut Fight Club in Grozny which helped young fighters get the opportunity to compete at the highest level.

Several fighters who were successful in ACB have gone on to sign with more well known promotions such as the UFC. ACB had its own fight team, the Fight Club Berkut, which consisted of some of the promotion's  fighters, such as  Beslan Isaev, Magomed Bibulatov, Musa Khamanaev and Aslambek Saidov. ACB co-operated with other promotions in Europe by exchanging fighters, for example KSW and The Cage. ACB ran the majority of its shows live on a variety of TV networks (Match TV, Polsat Sport) throughout Europe. The promotion ran its shows live internationally on its Facebook page.

International Expansion 
The 2017 campaign featured 27 events spanning across thirteen countries, including the United States, Austria, Poland, England, Tajikistan, Belarus, Turkey, Kazakhstan, Canada, Brazil, Germany, Australia and Russia.

TECH-Krep FC purchase 
On September 12, 2018, Mairbek Khasiev revealed that Absolute Championship Berkut had purchased TECH-Krep FC. Khasiev went on to explain that TECH-Krep FC would cease operation and cancel their October 26 event, and that former Tech-Krep FC head Alexey Yatsenko would become the president of ACB.

WFCA acquisition and integration 
On November 28, 2018, the Head of the Chechen Republic Ramzan Kadyrov announced that the Absolute Championship Berkut (ACB) and the World Fighting Championship Akhmat (WFCA) would merge to form a single promotion.

US Sanctions 

On December 20, 2020, the U.S. Department of Treasury announced sanctions against ACA and Akhmat MMA due to their ownership by Kadyrov. Due to this, no American citizen or company can do business with them, meaning all American fighters could face fines or jail time if they fight for the organization. Brett Cooper was the first fighter to pull out of his fight at ACA 116: Froes vs Balaev due to the sanctions.

Roster

List of events

2023 events

Current champions

Mixed martial arts

Rankings

The rankings for the ACA's fighters are both recorded and updated when information has been obtained from the ACA's website.

Championship history

Mixed martial arts

Heavyweight Championship

over 93 kg (over 205 lb)

Light Heavyweight Championship

93 kg (205 lb)

Middleweight Championship

84 kg (185 lb)

{| class="wikitable" style="width:97%; font-size:90%;"
|-
!  style= width:1%;"|No.
!  style= width:20%;"|Name
!  style= width:18%;"|Event
!  style=width:13%;"|Date
!  style= width:45%;"|Defenses 
|-
!Current
|align=left |  Magomedrasul Gasanov 
|align=center |ACB 121
|align=center | April 9, 2021
|align=left | 

|-
| style="text-align:center;" colspan="5"|Salamu Abdurakhmanov vacated the title due to health reasons
|-
!Interim
|align=left | Magomedrasul Gasanov
|align=center |ACB 121|align=center | April 9, 2021
|align=left |
|-
!3
|align=left | Salamu Abdurakhmanov 
|align=center |ACA 95|align=center | April 27, 2019
|align=left |

|-
| style="text-align:center;" colspan="5"|ACB and WFCA merging to become ACA.|-
!2
|align=left | Albert Duraev
|align=center |ACB 77|align=center | December 23, 2017
|align=left |

|-
| style="text-align:center;" colspan="5"|Anatoly Tokov vacated the title when he signed for M-1 Global.|-
!1
|align=left | Anatoly Tokov 
|align=center |ACB 38|align=center | May 20, 2016
|align=left |
|}

Welterweight Championship77 kg (170 lb)Lightweight Championship70 kg (155 lb)ACA 154: Vakhaev vs Goncharov

Featherweight Championship66 kg (145 lb)Bantamweight Championship61 kg (135 lb)Flyweight Championship57 kg (125 lb)Kickboxing

Heavyweight Championship120 kg (265 lb)Middleweight Championship84 kg (185 lb)Welterweight Championship77 kg (170 lb)Brazilian jiu-jitsu

GI Heavyweight Championship120 kg (265 lb)GI Light Heavyweight Championship95 kg (209 lb)GI Middleweight Championship85 kg (187 lb)GI Welterweight Championship75 kg (165 lb)GI Lightweight Championship65 kg (143 lbs)GI Featherweight Championship60 kg (132 lbs)''

Grand Prix champions

Notable fighters

Mixed martial arts

  Amir Aliakbari
  Ben Alloway
  Saul Almeida
  Dylan Andrews
  Gadzhimurad Antigulov
  Scott Askham
  Niklas Bäckström
  Luke Barnatt
  Magomed Bibulatov
  E. J. Brooks
  Paul Buentello
  Nah-Shon Burrell
  Chris Camozzi
  Steve Carl
  Dan Charles
  Joachim Christensen
  Brett Cooper 
  Carlos Eduardo
  Rob Emerson
  Efrain Escudero
  Gustavo Falciroli
  Christos Giagos
  Fernando Gonzalez
  Chase Gormley
  Sergej Grecicho
  Mike Grundy
  Piotr Hallmann
  Pat Healy 
  Marcin Held
  Bubba Jenkins
  Georgi Karakhanyan
  Mamed Khalidov
  Magomedrasul Khasbulaev
  Mike Kyle
  Anthony Leone
  Artem Lobov 
  Murad Machaev
  Reza Madadi
  Leonardo Mafra
  Vinny Magalhães
  Zabit Magomedsharipov
  John Maguire 
  Zach Makovsky
  Nick Mamalis
  Alonzo Martinez
  Danny Martinez
  Rasul Mirzaev
  David Mitchell
  Takeya Mizugaki
  Luis Alberto Nogueira
  Daniel Omielańczuk
  Luis Palomino
  Norman Parke
  Nam Phan
  Jesse Ronson
  Donald Sanchez
  André Santos
  Daniel Sarafian
  Alexander Sarnavskiy
  Fábio Silva
  Leandro Silva
  Thiago Silva
  Dennis Siver
  Clifford Starks
  Akop Stepanyan
  Hans Stringer
  Michinori Tanaka
  Luis Tavares 
  Thiago Tavares
  Jesse Taylor
  Michail Tsarev
  Albert Tumenov
  Vyacheslav Vasilevsky
  Rodolfo Vieira
  Marcos Vinicius
  Rodney Wallace
  Robert Whiteford
  Mike Wilkinson
  Andre Winner
  Petr Yan

Kickboxing
    
  Benjamin Adegbuyi 
  Chingiz Allazov 
  Dzhabar Askerov
  Jamal Ben Saddik 
  Yuri Bessmertny
  Igor Bugaenko 
  Redouan Cairo
  Mikhail Chalykh
  Sebastian Ciobanu 
  Hicham El Gaoui 
  Freddy Kemayo
  Enriko Kehl
  Albert Kraus
  Artem Levin
  Alka Matewa  
  Tsotne Rogava
  Sitthichai Sitsongpeenong  
  Alexander Stetsurenko 
  Warren Stevelmans
  Sorin Tănăsie
  Luis Tavares 
  Vlad Tuinov

Brazilian jiu-jitsu
    
  Marcus Almeida 
  Romulo Barral
  Yan Cabral
  Claudio Calasans
  Keenan Cornelius
  Braulio Estima 
  Michael Langhi
  Lucas Lepri 
  Leandro Lo
  Vinny Magalhães  
  Augusto Mendes
  Paulo Miyao
  Marcos Oliveira
  Felipe Pena
  Jackson Sousa 
  Otávio Souza 
  Léo Vieira
  Rodolfo Vieira
  Gordon Ryan

See also
List of current ACA fighters
2014 in Absolute Championship Berkut
2015 in Absolute Championship Berkut
2016 in Absolute Championship Berkut
2017 in Absolute Championship Berkut
2018 in Absolute Championship Berkut
2019 in Absolute Championship Akhmat
2020 in Absolute Championship Akhmat

Notes

References

External links
 ACA at Sherdog
 ACB on FITE

 
Organizations established in 2012
Mixed martial arts organizations
Sports organizations of Russia
Mixed martial arts events lists
Kickboxing organizations
Kickboxing in Russia
Mixed martial arts in Russia
2012 establishments in Russia
Sport in Grozny